"Pipes of Peace" is a song written by English musician Paul McCartney, released as the title track on his 1983 album of the same name. It was also released as a single in December 1983 and reached number 1 on the UK singles charts for two weeks. The song also reached number 1 on the Irish singles chart.

Recording
The basic track was recorded on 10 September 1982 at AIR Studios, with orchestral overdubs added later, probably at the same studio. Paul McCartney plays piano, bass and knee-percussion, while tabla was added by James Kippen, who tried "something like 20–30 takes" before McCartney was satisfied. A special session was organized to have the Pestalozzi Children Choir adding their voices.

Personnel

Paul McCartney – vocals, bass, piano, synthesizer, knee-percussion, drums, orchestra arrangements
Linda McCartney – backing vocals
Eric Stewart – backing vocals
Adrian Brett – pan flute
James Kippen – tabla
Pestalozzi Children Choir – choir

Charts
In the United States, "Pipes of Peace" was issued as the B-side, and its British B-side, "So Bad", was issued as the A-side. "So Bad" reached number 23 at the US Billboard Hot 100
and reached number 3 on the Billboard Adult Contemporary chart. "So Bad" peaked at 18 on the Canadian RPM Chart (and two weeks at #2 AC).

Video
At Chobham Common, Surrey, a video was shot for "Pipes of Peace", depicting the famous 1914 Christmas truce between British and German troops. It portrays a British and a German soldier, both played by McCartney, who meet up in No Man's Land and exchange photos of their loved ones while other soldiers fraternise and play football. When a shell blast forces the two armies to retreat to their own trenches both men realise that they still have each other's pictures. The video was produced by Hugh Symonds, featured more than 100 extras, and for added realism McCartney had his hair cut short especially for the shoot.

In November 2014, the British supermarket chain Sainsbury's, in partnership with the Royal British Legion, produced a Christmas advert whose look and narrative were widely recognized as being based on McCartney's "Pipes of Peace" video. As in "Pipes of Peace" the British and German soldier return to their trenches to discover that they have inadvertently swapped their gifts from home.

Other
Argentine singer-songwriter Sergio Denis recorded a Spanish version of the song re-titled Pipas de la paz on his album La Humanidad (1984).

The McCartney recording was included on the UK and Canada version of the 1987 compilation All the Best!, and the 2001 compilation Wingspan: Hits and History.

In 2017, the band MUNA covered the song for Capitol Music Group’s compilation Holidays Rule Vol. 2.

See also
List of anti-war songs

Notes

1983 singles
Paul McCartney songs
Peace songs
Anti-war songs
UK Singles Chart number-one singles
Parlophone singles
Song recordings produced by George Martin
Songs written by Paul McCartney
Music published by MPL Music Publishing
1983 songs
Christmas truce